Montrose is a historic estate and national historic district located at Hillsborough, Orange County, North Carolina.  The main house was built about 1900 and remodeled in 1948.  It is a two-story, three bay, double-pile frame dwelling with a high-hip, slate-covered roof, and flanking one-story wings. It features a Colonial Revival style pedimented entrance pavilion with a swan's neck pediment.  Also on the property are the contributing William Alexander Graham Law Office (1842, c. 1893) with Federal style design elements, garage (1935), kitchen (c. 1845), smokehouse (c. 1830), pump house (1948), tractor shed (1948), animal shelter (1948), barn (c. 1830-1845) and the landscaped gardens (c. 1842-1977).

It was listed on the National Register of Historic Places in 2001.  It is located in the Hillsborough Historic District.

References

Historic districts on the National Register of Historic Places in North Carolina
Federal architecture in North Carolina
Colonial Revival architecture in North Carolina
Houses completed in 1900
Hillsborough, North Carolina
Buildings and structures in Orange County, North Carolina
National Register of Historic Places in Orange County, North Carolina
Individually listed contributing properties to historic districts on the National Register in North Carolina